This is a list of electoral results for the electoral district of Bowen in Queensland state elections.

Members for Bowen

Election results

Elections in the 1980s
Results for the 1989 election were:

Elections in the 1960s

Elections in the 1940s

Elections in the 1930s

Elections in the 1920s

Elections in the 1910s

References

Queensland state electoral results by district